Jean Jérôme (1906—1990) was a Polish Jew-French communist activist and Resistance member.

Jean Jérôme or Jean-Jérôme may also refer to:
Jean-Jérôme Adam (1904–1981), French Roman Catholic archbishop
Jean Jérôme Hamer (1916–1996), Belgian Cardinal
Jean-René Jérôme (1942–1991), Haitian painter
Jean-Robens Jerome (born 1983), Haitian footballer

See also
Jean-Léon Gérôme (1824–1904), French painter and sculptor